Ecuador is an underground metro station on the Line 1 of the Santiago Metro, in Santiago, Chile. Three elevators were installed in 2005, to make the station fully accessible for people who use wheelchairs or have mobility impairments.

The station was opened on 15 September 1975 as part of the inaugural section of the line between San Pablo and La Moneda.

References

Santiago Metro stations
Railway stations opened in 1975
1975 establishments in Chile
Santiago Metro Line 1